Cohoctah Township is a civil township of Livingston County in the U.S. state of Michigan. The population was 3,317 at the 2010 census. It is located in the northwest quadrant of the county, bordered by Conway Township to the west, Deerfield Township to the east, and Howell Township to the south. To the north is Shiawassee County.

History
Cohoctah Township was first organized in 1838 with the name of Tuscola Township. It was renamed Bristol Township in 1857 and given its current name in 1867. Boutell Cemetery and Sanford Cemetery are located in the township.

Communities
Farming is the primary use of land, with only three small towns serving as population centers: 
The ZIP code is 48816. There is a gas station, a small post office, and a machine shop. It started around a grain elevator in 1886 that is currently still there, but not in operation.
It was settled in 1833 by Lyman Boughton and Gilbert Prentiss. The town was also called "Sprungtown" for Isaac Sprung, one of its more prominent citizens. It is the site of the township hall, but has no retail or commercial establishments.
The ZIP code is 48863. It had a general store, but currently no retail or commercial establishments.
 Per the 1875 Plat Maps of Livingston County, the community currently known as Cohoctah Center was labeled as Cohoctah and is located in Section 16 of Cohoctah Township. Section 16 was commonly referred to as the school section within the townships due to the practice of placing a rural school near the center of each township in Section 16. There is no community or improvements depicted on the map in the northeasterly area of the township where the current community of Cohoctah is located.
 Per the 1895 Plat Maps of Livingston County, the current community of Cohoctah Center is labeled as Cohoctah as it was in the 1875 map. A change from the prior map is that a north–south railroad line is shown running through the easterly portion of the township. There is also a depot depicted with the community of East Cohoctah at the location of the current community of Cohoctah.
 Per the 1915 Plat Maps of Livingston County, the community labeled as Cohoctah in the two prior maps is labeled as Cohoctah Center, just as it is currently known. The community located at the railroad depot, that had been labeled as East Cohoctah in 1895, is labeled as Cohoctah, also as it is currently known. Originally the community of Cohoctah was centered at the location of the rural school, in Section 16. As the township evolved with the construction of the railroad, the community's commerce center shifted from the location of the school to that of the railroad depot, which then became the predominant community within the township.

Geography
The township is drained to the north by the South Branch of the Shiawassee River, running near the eastern border of the township.

Demographics
As of the census of 2000, there were 3,394 people, 1,124 households, and 938 families residing in the township. The racial makeup of the township was 97.91% White, 0.06% African American, 0.47% Native American, 0.27% Asian, 0.09% Pacific Islander, 0.38% from other races, and 0.82% from two or more races. Hispanic or Latino of any race were 0.94% of the population.

There were 1,124 households, out of which 41.7% had children under the age of 18 living with them, 73.3% were married couples living together, 6.0% had a female householder with no husband present, and 16.5% were non-families. 13.0% of all households were made up of individuals, and 4.6% had someone living alone who was 65 years of age or older.  The average household size was 3.02 and the average family size was 3.30.

In the township the population was spread out, with 29.0% under the age of 18, 7.7% from 18 to 24, 31.1% from 25 to 44, 25.3% from 45 to 64, and 6.9% who were 65 years of age or older.  The median age was 36 years. For every 100 females, there were 108.6 males.  For every 100 females age 18 and over, there were 104.5 males.

The median income for a household in the township was $57,500, and the median income for a family was $63,182. Males had a median income of $51,028 versus $27,750 for females. The per capita income for the township was $21,582.  About 1.9% of families and 2.6% of the population were below the poverty line, including 4.0% of those under age 18 and 3.3% of those age 65 or over.

References

Notes

Sources

External links
 Municipal Webpage

Townships in Livingston County, Michigan
1838 establishments in Michigan
Townships in Michigan